Hallehurst is a historic mansion in Pulaski, Tennessee, U.S.. It was built in 1878 for Newton Harris White, a politician. It has been listed on the National Register of Historic Places since September 6, 2006.

References

Houses on the National Register of Historic Places in Tennessee
Colonial Revival architecture in Tennessee
Houses completed in 1920
Houses in Giles County, Tennessee
Historic districts on the National Register of Historic Places in Tennessee
National Register of Historic Places in Giles County, Tennessee